The 1978 BC Lions finished in fourth place in the CFL Western Conference with a 7–7–2 record and failed to make the playoffs. A six-game mid-season losing streak, primarily to western opponents, cost the Lions a playoff spot.

Quarterback Jerry Tagge had 3134 yards passing and 20 interceptions. The offence was driven by rookie running back Larry Key, who had 1054 yards rushing, 504 yards receiving and 10 touchdowns.

Centre Al Wilson was selected to the CFL all-star team for the 4th consecutive season.

A new uniform was introduced which included the white helmet, orange and white colour scheme and now iconic mountain lion head logo. The traditional secondary colour of black was altered to a dark brown. The uniforms would become synonymous with the powerhouse teams of the 1980s in brand new BC Place stadium. The logo, despite a few changes along the way since, is still used by the team to this day.

Offseason

CFL Draft

Preseason

Regular season

Season standings

Season schedule

Offensive leaders

Awards and records

1978 CFL All-Stars
 C – Al Wilson, CFL All-Star

References

BC Lions seasons
1978 Canadian Football League season by team
1978 in British Columbia